Bisegna is a comune and town in the Province of L'Aquila in the Abruzzo region of Italy.

References

Cities and towns in Abruzzo
Marsica